Naomi Chapman Woodroof (February 5, 1900 – January 4, 1989) was an American agriculturalist known for increasing peanut yields five-fold. She was the first woman to attend and graduate from the University of Idaho College of Agriculture and achieved posthumous recognition for her research, including the breeding of peanuts, the fertilization of pecans, and the prevention and control of cotton diseases.

Early life 
Woodroof was born on February 5, 1900, to parents James Leslie Chapman and Grace Ora Chapman, a pioneer family, who settled in Idaho along the Snake River. She grew up on a ranch responsible for the care of both sheep and cattle. Due to growing up on her parents' ranch, she decided to further her education in the area of animal husbandry by attending the University of the Idaho College of Agriculture.

Career 
Woodroof was the first woman student and first woman to graduate from the University of the Idaho College of Agriculture, and the first woman to be inducted into the Georgia Agriculture Hall of Fame due to her research in peanut farming. She  was responsible for founding the Plant Pathology Department located at the Coastal Plain Experiment Station where she became an essential component to the developments in peanut breeding. Here she developed a method of breeding which allowed for a fivefold increase in peanut crops. This development led to the allowance of Georgia to become the United States' leading producer of peanuts. Because of her findings regarding peanuts, she was named an honorary member of the "Ton-an-Acre" Peanut Club.

In her later years, she traveled to underdeveloped countries and shared information regarding disease control among crops, how to increase the harvest amount, and better methods of storing food.

Marriage and children 
While working on a pecan project, she met Jasper Guy Woodroof whom she married in 1926. They had three children: Jane, Cade, and Jasper. When her husband was named the first President of the Abraham Baldwin Agricultural College, the family moved to Tifton, Georgia, where Woodroof continued her peanut research.

Death 
Naomi Chapman Woodroof died on January 4, 1989, at 88 years old. According to her son-in-law, "she was way ahead of her time, she was working in a man's world, but she was not competing, she was simply contributing."

Citations

Works Cited 

 
 
 
 

1900 births
1989 deaths
American agriculturalists
University of Idaho alumni